Sava Bridge may refer to:

 Ada Bridge, a cable-stayed bridge over the Sava river in Belgrade, Serbia
 Sava River Bridge (A3), an A3 motorway bridge in Croatia
 Sava Bridge, Zagreb, a pedestrian bridge in Zagreb, Croatia
 Rača Bridge, bridge over Sava between Serbia and Republika Srpska, Bosnia and Herzegovina